Vladimir "Vlada" Jovanović (born 15 March 1984) is a Serbian professional basketball coach. He currently serves as the head coach for Igokea of the ABA League.

Coaching career

FMP (2012–2020) 
Jovanović was an assistant coach for the FMP as a part of coaching staff of coaches Milan Gurović and Slobodan Klipa from 2012 to 2016. During the 2016–17 season, he worked with the Crvena zvezda under-16 team and won the national championship.

On 27 July 2017, Jovanović returns to FMP as the head coach. He made his Adriatic League debut as the head coach on 29 September in a 74–67 road loss to Cedevita. Jovanović got his first taste of the NBA through Summer League coaching stint in the 2018 season with the Los Angeles Clippers. In July 2020, he signed a two-year extension with FMP. On 14 December 2020, Jovanović and FMP have parted ways on mutual consent, following a 2–6 record on the start of the 2020–21 ABA season.

Cibona (2021–2022) 
On 2 February 2021, Croatian team Cibona hired Jovanović as their new head coach. He is the first Cibona's head coach from Serbia after Dragan Šakota in 1990. On 8 January 2022, Cibona and Jovanović parted ways on mutual consent, following a 83–73 loss to Zabok. He finished his stint in Zagreb with a 39–25 record.

Crvena zvezda (2022) 
On 8 July 2022, Crvena zvezda hired Jovanović as their new head coach. On 13 November 2022, he parted ways with the club. Under his guidance, Crvena zvezda recorded one win and six losses in the EuroLeague and had a 4–1 record in ABA play.

National team coaching career 
Jovanović was an assistant coach for the Serbia U18 national team at the 2016 FIBA U18 European Championship in Turkey.

On 5 December 2019, Jovanović was named an assistant coach for the Serbia national team under Igor Kokoškov. In September 2021, he left the National team as the assistant coach.

In December 2021, the Basketball Federation of Serbia named him the new head coach of the Serbia national under-20 team. His team won a gold medal at the 2022 FIBA U20 European Championship Division B in Tbilisi, Georgia with an undefeated record at 7–0.

Coaching record

EuroLeague

|- 
| align="left"|Crvena zvezda
| align="left"|2022–23
| 7 || 1 || 6 ||  || align="center"|Parted ways
|-class="sortbottom"
| align="center" colspan=2|Career||7||1||6||||

Personal life 
Jovanović and his wife Jelena has two children, a son Vasilije and daughter Lenka (born 2020).

References

External links
 Jovanovic ABA League Profile
 Coach Profile at eurobasket.com

1984 births
Living people
KK Cibona coaches
KK Crvena zvezda head coaches
KK Crvena zvezda youth coaches
KK FMP coaches
People from Mladenovac
Serbian expatriate basketball people in Bosnia and Herzegovina
Serbian expatriate basketball people in Croatia
Serbian men's basketball coaches